The Eastern Cape litter-skink (Lygisaurus sesbrauna) is a species of skink found in Queensland in Australia.

References

Lygisaurus
Reptiles described in 1988
Skinks of Australia
Endemic fauna of Australia
Taxa named by Glen Joseph Ingram
Taxa named by Jeanette Covacevich